Linda Hasenfratz  (born June 1966) is a Canadian businesswoman, the president, chairman, and CEO of Linamar since 2002, when she succeeded her father Frank Hasenfratz.

Early life
Linda Hasenfratz is the daughter of Frank Hasenfratz, the founder of Linamar.

She has a bachelor's degree and an MBA, both from the University of Western Ontario.

Career
In 1990, she started her career as a machine operator at her father's car parts factory.

She has been CEO of Linamar since 2002, when she succeeded her father Frank Hasenfratz. Initially, the company faced a few rough years after Hasenfratz took over, but since then, double-digit growth has increased revenue to $6 billion, and $522 million in profit. Additionally, under Hasenfratz's leadership, there are now a total of 58 Linamar plants in 13 countries across Asia, North America and Europe. In May 2017, Hasenfratz spoke of Linamar's 23rd consecutive quarter of double-digit operating earnings growth.

Hasenfratz is a member of the Canadian Business Hall of Fame. In 2014, she was the first woman to be named Canada's EY Entrepreneur of the Year. 
She has been chair of the Business Council of Canada.  In 2018 she was named Canada's Outstanding CEO of the year. Also in 2018, Hasenfratz was named to the Order of Canada. In May 2019, she was named the University of Western Ontario's 23rd Chancellor.

In December 2020, Hasenfratz joined the COVID-19 vaccine task-force for Ontario during the COVID-19 pandemic in Ontario. Following revelations she travelled outside of the country despite travel warnings, Hasenfratz resigned from the task-force on January 19, 2021.

Personal life
She is married to Ed Newton, a general contractor; they have four children.

References

1966 births
Women corporate directors
Canadian corporate directors
Canadian women chief executives
21st-century Canadian businesswomen
21st-century Canadian businesspeople
Living people
University of Western Ontario alumni
Canadian people of Hungarian descent
Members of the Order of Canada
Chancellors of the University of Western Ontario